Chayut Triyachart (born 9 October 1989) is a Thai-born Singaporean former badminton player. At the Commonwealth Games, he won a silver medal in the 2014 men's doubles, and two bronze medals in the 2014 mixed team and 2010 mixed doubles.

In July 2015, Triyachart suffered a partial tear in his achilles tendon and struggled to recover from his injury. With the setback, he decided to quit professional badminton.

Achievements

Commonwealth Games 
Men's doubles

Mixed doubles

Southeast Asian Games 
Men's doubles

BWF Grand Prix 
The BWF Grand Prix had two levels, the BWF Grand Prix and Grand Prix Gold. It was a series of badminton tournaments sanctioned by the Badminton World Federation (BWF) which was held from 2007 to 2017.

Men's doubles

Mixed doubles

  BWF Grand Prix Gold tournament
  BWF Grand Prix tournament

BWF International Challenge/Series 
Men's doubles

Mixed doubles

  BWF International Challenge tournament
  BWF International Series tournament

References

External links 

 
 
  (2010)
  (2014)
 

1989 births
Living people
Chayut Triyachart
Thai expatriates in Singapore
Naturalised citizens of Singapore
Singaporean male badminton players
Badminton players at the 2010 Commonwealth Games
Badminton players at the 2014 Commonwealth Games
Commonwealth Games bronze medallists for Singapore
Commonwealth Games medallists in badminton
Badminton players at the 2014 Asian Games
Asian Games competitors for Singapore
Competitors at the 2011 Southeast Asian Games
Competitors at the 2015 Southeast Asian Games
Southeast Asian Games bronze medalists for Singapore
Southeast Asian Games medalists in badminton
Medallists at the 2010 Commonwealth Games
Medallists at the 2014 Commonwealth Games